Gaston of Orléans  may refer to:
Gaston, Duke of Orléans (1608–1660)
Prince Gaston, Count of Eu (1842–1922)
Prince Gaston of Orléans (2009–)